Julio Bernardo Vega de Boyrie (born February 23, 1938), most known as Bernardo Vega, is a Dominican academic and politician.

Early life
Bernardo Vega was born in Santiago de los Caballeros, Dominican Republic on February 23, 1938. He is the son of Dominican writer Julio Vega Batlle and María Teresa de Boyrie de Moya. He completed his primary education in Santiago de los Caballeros and later earned a Degree in economics from the University of Pennsylvania, United States in 1959.

Career
Vega has also held many important public offices, including: Member of the Central Bank's Monetary Board (1975-1981), Director of the Museum of Dominican Man (1978-1982), Governor of the Central Bank of the Dominican Republic (1982-1984) and Ambassador to Washington (1996 -1998). He taught economics at the Pontifical Catholic University Mother and Teacher and the Autonomous University of Santo Domingo. Vega has won the National History Award four times (1986, 1989, 1990, 1991).

Bibliography

References

1938 births
Ambassadors of the Dominican Republic to the United States
Descendants of Ulises Espaillat
Dominican Republic male writers
20th-century Dominican Republic historians
Dominican Republic economists
Dominican Republic people of Catalan descent
Dominican Republic people of French descent
Dominican Republic people of Italian descent
21st-century Dominican Republic historians
Governors of the Central Bank of the Dominican Republic
White Dominicans
Living people